Kossuth is an unincorporated community in Clarion County, Pennsylvania, United States. Kossuth has a post office with ZIP code 16331, which opened on October 16, 1849.

References

Unincorporated communities in Clarion County, Pennsylvania
Unincorporated communities in Pennsylvania